Kreutziger is a surname. Notable persons with that name include:

 Christof Kreuziger (born 1948), German rower
 Roman Kreuziger Sr. (born 1965), Czech bicycle racer
 Roman Kreuziger (born 1986), Czech bicycle racer
 Sebastian Kreuziger (born 1991), German motorcycle racer

See also
 Kreuzinger
 Kreutzinger